The women's qualification took place at the O2 Arena on October 14, 2009.

Individual all-around

Vault

Uneven bars

Balance beam

Floor exercise

2009 in women's gymnastics
2009 World Artistic Gymnastics Championships